Jake Matthew Cooper (born 3 February 1995) is an English professional footballer who plays as a centre-back for Millwall.

Club career

Early life and career
Cooper was born in Bracknell, Berkshire, and attended The Forest School, Winnersh. He joined the Reading F.C. Academy as a 14-year-old in 2009, going on to sign his first professional contract with the club in June 2013, on a contract going through to the end of the 2015–16 season.

Cooper made his debut, for Reading in their 1–0 Championship victory over Ipswich Town on 16 August 2014, coming on as an 87th-minute substitute for Nick Blackman. He scored his first goals for Reading on 29 November, in a 2–1 win away to Norwich City.

On 8 October 2015, Cooper extended his contract with the club until June 2018.

Millwall
On 19 January 2017, Cooper joined League One club Millwall on loan until the end of the 2016–17 season.

Cooper signed a three-year contract for Millwall on 28 July 2017.

International career
Cooper has represented England at under-18, under-19 and under-20 levels. His first call-up came in February 2013 for the under-18 game against Belgium, in which he made his debut.

Cooper earned his first England under-20 call-up in March 2016, making his debut against in a 2–1 defeat to Canada on 27 March.

Career statistics

Honours
Millwall
EFL League One play-offs: 2017

References

External links
Profile at the Millwall F.C. website

1995 births
Living people
People from Bracknell
Footballers from Berkshire
English footballers
Association football defenders
Reading F.C. players
Millwall F.C. players
English Football League players
England youth international footballers